Hester Witvoet (born 7 July 1967) is a Dutch former professional tennis player.

A left-handed player from Driebergen, Witvoet competed on the professional tour in the late 1980s. She reached a best singles ranking of 64 in the world and featured in the main draws of the Australian Open, French Open and Wimbledon during her career. In 1988 she had her best year on the WTA Tour, making the quarterfinals at the New South Wales Open and semifinals at the Virginia Slims of Kansas.

ITF finals

Singles (3–1)

Doubles (3–1)

References

External links
 
 

1967 births
Living people
Dutch female tennis players
People from Driebergen-Rijsenburg
20th-century Dutch women
21st-century Dutch women
Sportspeople from Utrecht (province)